"My Angel Rocks Back and Forth" is a song by Four Tet, released on 3 May 2004 as a 12-inch single and CD single. The title track was originally part of Four Tet's previous album, Rounds. The CD edition comes with a bonus DVD of all of Four Tet's promotional videos to date.

The track was used as part of the soundtrack for Britney Spears's 2008 documentary, Britney: For the Record.

Track listing

Charts

References

External links
My Angel Rocks Back and Forth release page from the Domino Records website

2004 EPs
Four Tet albums
Domino Recording Company EPs